The Canadian Society for Epidemiology and Biostatistics (CSEB), or Société Canadienne d'épidémiologie et de biostatistique (SCEB), was founded in 1990 to promote epidemiology and biostatistics research in Canada; encourage the use of epidemiologic data in formulating  public health policy; increase the level of epidemiology and biostatistics funding available through federal, provincial, and private sources; facilitate communications among epidemiologists and biostatisticians; and assist faculty or schools of medicine and public health to improve training in epidemiology and biostatistics.

President
Mark Oremus, PhD, School of Public Health and Health Systems, University of Waterloo

Past presidents
 1991-1993              Nancy Kreiger
 1993-1995              Jean Joly
 1995-1997              Roy West
 1997-1999              Nancy Mayo
 1999-2001              Jack Siemiatycki
 2001-2003              Rick Gallagher
 2003-2007              Yang Mao
 2007–2011              Colin Soskolne
 2011–2013              Susan Jaglal
 2013–2016              Thy Dinh
 2016–Present           Mark Oremus

Collaborators and affiliates
CSEB bridges both the research and practice aspects of epidemiology and biostatistics through close collaboration with other groups such as the Public Health Agency of Canada (PHAC), Health Canada, the Association of Public Health Epidemiologists in Ontario (APHEO), the Saskatchewan Epidemiology Association (SEA), the Statistical Society of Canada (SSC), and the International Joint Policy Committee of the Societies of Epidemiology (IJPC-SE).

References

Organizations established in 1990
Medical and health organizations based in Canada
1990 establishments in Canada
Epidemiology organizations